Deserticossus janychar is a moth in the family Cossidae. It is found in Asia Minor.

The length of the forewings is 17–19 mm for males and about 20 mm for females. The forewings are sand-yellow with small black dots at the costal margin. The hindwings are light-brown with a
stroky pattern at the hind margin.

References

Natural History Museum Lepidoptera generic names catalog

Cossinae
Moths described in 2006
Moths of Asia